Revolutionary Party of the Proletariat – Bases for Revolution (in Portuguese: Partido Revolucionário do Proletariado - Bases pela Revolução), a political party in Portugal led by Luis Cardoso. It was founded on July 17, 2002 as a refoundation of Revolutionary Party of the Proletariat - Revolutionary Brigades.

External links
PRP-BR website

2002 establishments in Portugal
Communist parties in Portugal
Political parties established in 2002
Political parties in Portugal